The Formula of Rainbow is a 1966 Soviet fantasy comedy film directed by Georgi Yungvald-Khilkevich.

Plot 
The film tells about the scientist Vladimir Bantikov, who decides to create his double in the form of a robot, but this robot suddenly began to live its own life...

Cast 
 Nikolai Fedortsov as Vladimir Bantikov / Yashka the robot
 Rayisa Nedashkivska as Lyusya Petrova
 Savely Kramarov as Vasya	
Ivan Ryzhov as Petya
Frunzik Mkrtchyan as Frunzik Kaburyan
Georgy Vitsin as Toy factory manager
Roman Tkachuk as Kozdolevsky
Natalya Varley as Nurse
 Nikolai Grinko as Vacationer
 Zoya Fyodorova as Aunt Shura

References

External links 
 

1966 comedy films
1966 films
Films scored by Aleksandr Zatsepin
1960s Russian-language films
1960s fantasy comedy films
Soviet fantasy comedy films